An economic vegetarian is a person who practices vegetarianism from either the philosophical viewpoint that the consumption of meat is expensive, part of a conscious simple living strategy or just because of necessity. In the developing world, where large numbers of poor people might not be averse to eating meat, they are regularly forced to not eat it, since meat can often be a luxury.

Motivations
Economic vegetarians believe that nutrition can be acquired more efficiently and at a lower price through vegetables, grains, etc., rather than from meat. They argue as health vegetarians that a vegetarian diet is rich in vitamins, dietary fiber, and complex carbohydrates, and carries with it fewer risks (such as heart disease, obesity, and bacterial infection) than animal flesh. Consequently, they consider the production of meat economically unsound.

Some vegetarians are motivated by a lifestyle of simple living or adopt vegetarianism through necessity. For example, in the United Kingdom, necessity changed dietary habits during the period around World War II and the early 1950s, as animal products were strictly rationed and allotment or home-grown fruit and vegetables were readily available. Before that during World War I, Americans were encouraged to go one day of the week meatless in order to save meat rations for the troops, which began the "Meatless Monday" revolution. In developing countries people sometimes follow a mainly vegetarian diet simply because meat resources are scarce or expensive compared to alternative food sources. The same principle can also be a deciding factor in influencing the diet of low-income households in the Western world. The price of ground beef in the year 1985 was $1.28 per pound, and as of 2016 the price increased to $3.98 per pound, corresponding to a 39% increase in real terms over the last 31 years. The majority of the price increase has happened between 2004 and 2016, increasing by $1.72 over the 12-year period. These price increases make it hard for low-income households to continue to include meat as a part of their diet.

Many economic vegetarians also promote the idea that advanced agricultural techniques have made the production of meat outdated and inefficient. Some promote the idea of synthetic and cloned meat.

Criticism

See also
 Balanced diet
 Environmental vegetarianism
 Simple living
 Sustainable diet
 Sustainable living
 Vegetarianism
 Zoonosis

References

Works cited
 

Vegetarianism
Simple living